is the railway station in Mikuriya-machi Sato-men, Matsuura, Nagasaki Prefecture. It is operated by Matsuura Railway and is on the Nishi-Kyūshū Line.

Lines 
Matsuura Railway
Nishi-Kyūshū Line

Adjacent stations

Station layout
The station is at ground level with one island platform and two tracks.

The platform is attached to the station building, which is at a railroad crossing. A waiting room is next to the compounding of medicines drugstore which borrowed a station site, and was established and can use the inside in the business hours of the drugstore.

Environs
National Route 204
Matsuura City Office Mikuriya Branch
Mikuriya Post Office
Oshibuchi Hospital
A-COOP Mikuriya (Supermarket)

History
April 1, 1987 - Railways privatize and this station is inherited by JR Kyushu.
April 1, 1988 - This station is inherited by Matsuura Railway and renamed to present name.

External links
Matsuura Railway (Japanese)

Railway stations in Japan opened in 1935
Railway stations in Nagasaki Prefecture